Larry Rodriguez (born May 5, 1983) is a Filipino professional basketball player for the Davao Occidental Tigers of the Pilipinas Super League (PSL). He was drafted ninth overall in the 2008 PBA draft alongside prolific rookies Gabe Norwood, Jared Dillinger, and Jayson Castro.

Professional career

In 2010, Rodriguez was traded to Rain or Shine in exchange for Eddie Laure and the Rain or Shine's 2011 first-round draft pick.

References

External links
Player Profile
PBA-Online! Profile

1983 births
Living people
Philippines men's national basketball team players
Filipino men's basketball players
Power forwards (basketball)
TNT Tropang Giga players
Barako Bull Energy Boosters players
Powerade Tigers players
Rain or Shine Elasto Painters players
Blackwater Bossing players
Southeast Asian Games medalists in basketball
Southeast Asian Games gold medalists for the Philippines
Maharlika Pilipinas Basketball League players
Competitors at the 2007 Southeast Asian Games
Barako Bull Energy Boosters draft picks